Teodors Eihmans (Russian: Фёдор Иванович Эйхманс, Feodor Ivanovich Eichmans; 25 April 1897 – 3 September 1938) was a Soviet security officer and first head of the Gulag (Main Directorate of Camps).

Biography
Eihmans was born to a Latvian peasant family in the Courland Governorate.

He was a member of the Latvian Riflemen and served in World War I but was soon demobilized after he was in wounded in combat. He later worked as a mechanic in Petrograd, and in 1917 joined the Bolshevik Party. After the October Revolution, he worked as an agent in the Petrograd Cheka.

During the Russian Civil War, Eihmans was transferred to Central Asia and became head of the Kazaly branch of the Cheka. He also was active in the Civil War in Turkestan and worked as an assistant to Gleb Bokii.

After the Civil War, he became head of the Solovki prison camp, replacing Alexander Nogtev. The camp was primarily intended to hold socialist opposition to the new Soviet government.

From 25 April to 16 June 1930 Eihmans became the first head of the Camps Administration (ULag, was transformed in October of the same year into the OGPU-GULag). He was entrusted with the leadership of all the OGPU camps of that time.

In 1930 he organized the Vaygach expedition of the OGPU and until 1932 was its head. Officially, the expedition was engaged in the exploration and development of non-ferrous metal ores on the Vaygach Island and the coast of the Kara Sea.

From 1932 to 1937 he was deputy head of the 9th department (the head of the department was Gleb Bokii), and head of the 3rd department of the 9th department of the GUGB NKVD of the Soviet Union. It was a three-person department that conducted cipher work and managed cryptography, organized cipher communication with foreign missions of the USSR. At the same time, Eichmans was deputy chief of the Special Department.

In July 1937, Ehimans was arrested on accounts of Trotskyism and later shot on 3 September 1938 at the NKVD's Butovo firing range. He was rehabilitated on 25 July 1956.

References

1897 births
1938 deaths
People from Courland
NKVD officers
Cheka officers
Majors of State Security
Gulag governors
Great Purge victims from Latvia
Soviet rehabilitations
Deaths by firearm in Russia
Bolsheviks